Pianfei is a comune (municipality) in the Province of Cuneo in the Italian region Piedmont, located about  south of Turin and about  east of Cuneo.

Pianfei borders the following municipalities: Chiusa di Pesio, Margarita, Mondovì, Roccaforte Mondovì, and Villanova Mondovì.

References

External links
 Official website

Cities and towns in Piedmont